"Nineteen" is a song written by Tom Hambridge, Jeffrey Steele, and Gary Nicholson. The song was originally recorded by the country music duo Waycross, whose version peaked at number 54 on the Billboard Hot Country Songs chart in July 2007. Taylor Hicks later recorded the song on his 2009 album The Distance, although his version of the song was not released as a single. It was then recorded by country music singer Billy Ray Cyrus, on his album I'm American, which was released on June 28, 2011. Cyrus' version of the song was released as the album's second single on September 26, 2011. Clayton Bellamy also recorded it on his 2012 album Everyone's a Dreamer.

Content
"Nineteen" tells the story of a high school football standout, who turns down the University of Tennessee to serve in the Marines after watching the September 11 attacks.

Reception

Critical
Taste of Country positively reviewed the song, rating it 4 stars out of five. The reviewer, Billy Dukes, comments on how many times the song has been recorded, but mentions that the song deserves the attention of the mainstream country audience.

Commercial
The song debuted at number 58 on the US Billboard Hot Country Songs chart for the week ending October 8, 2011. It is Cyrus' first chart entry since "A Good Day" peaked at number 59 on the country chart in September 2009.

Chart performance

Waycross

Billy Ray Cyrus

References

Songs about teenagers
Songs about the military
Music about the September 11 attacks
2007 singles
2007 songs
2011 singles
Taylor Hicks songs
Billy Ray Cyrus songs
Songs written by Jeffrey Steele
Song recordings produced by Buddy Cannon
Songs written by Tom Hambridge
Songs written by Gary Nicholson
Walt Disney Records singles